Anne-Marie Saint-Cerny is a Canadian writer and political activist from Quebec. She is most noted for her 2018 book Mégantic: Une tragédie annoncée, an examination of the Lac-Mégantic rail disaster of 2013, which was a shortlisted finalist for the Governor General's Award for French-language non-fiction at the 2018 Governor General's Awards.

She previously published the Zan series of children's books, as well as the novel La jouissance du loup à l'instant de mordre.

She was a Green Party of Canada candidate in Hochelaga in the 2015 federal election.

Electoral record

References

21st-century Canadian politicians
21st-century Canadian novelists
21st-century Canadian non-fiction writers
21st-century Canadian women writers
Canadian women novelists
Canadian women non-fiction writers
Canadian children's writers in French
Canadian novelists in French
Canadian non-fiction writers in French
Green Party of Canada candidates in the 2015 Canadian federal election
French Quebecers
Women in Quebec politics
Living people
Quebec candidates for Member of Parliament
Writers from Montreal
Politicians from Montreal
Year of birth missing (living people)
21st-century Canadian women politicians
Canadian women children's writers